The Virgin of Nuria (Catalan Mare de Déu de Núria) is a popular Roman Catholic shrine in the Valley of Nuria. The Catalan girls' name Núria derives from the shrine.

References

Shrines to the Virgin Mary